Nnebe is the name of an Igbo family. There are several Nnebes that span different towns in Igboland. One example is from Nibo, Awka South Local Government Area, of Anambra State, Nigeria.  They are part of ‘umunna’ Umuonyejekwe (‘umunna’ an extended family up to the fourth generation and cannot intermarry) in Umuezeanowi kinship in Umunono, Umuanum, Nibo.

Nwankwo Joseph Nnebe was a foremost educationist and missionary that brought the Catholic Priest that established Saint Theresa’s Catholic Church Nibo. He spearheaded the establishment of many missionary schools in eastern Nigeria. He retired in 1979 after over thirty-five years of service in the ministry of education of the old Anambra State as the Principal of Teacher Training College, Iwollo in present Enugu State.

Igbo families
Igbo names